David Michael Burtka (born May 29, 1975) is an American actor and professional chef. He is known for his acting roles in theatre and television shows such as How I Met Your Mother and The Play About the Baby. After his role on How I Met Your Mother, Burtka gained media attention for dating Neil Patrick Harris, whom he later married in 2014.

Early life
Burtka was born in Dearborn, Michigan, the son of Deborah A. Zajas (died 2008) and Daniel Burtka. He is of Polish descent. He grew up in Canton, Michigan, and graduated from Salem High School in 1993. He trained in acting at Interlochen Center for the Arts, obtained his Bachelor of Fine Arts from the University of Michigan and had further training at the William Esper Studios.

Acting career

Burtka made his television debut in 2002 with a guest role on The West Wing. This was followed by guest appearances on  Crossing Jordan.

Burtka made his Broadway debut as Tulsa in the 2003 revival of Gypsy, which starred Bernadette Peters. He played The Boy in the American premiere of Edward Albee's The Play About the Baby, for which he won the 2001 Clarence Derwent Award for most promising male performer.

In 2004, Burtka originated the role of Matt in the musical The Opposite of Sex and reprised the role in the work's East Coast premiere in the summer of 2006.

Burtka appeared in seven episodes of How I Met Your Mother, playing "Scooter", the former high school boyfriend of Lily Aldrin (Alyson Hannigan), who still had not gotten over their breakup. Burtka made a cameo appearance, in A Very Harold & Kumar 3D Christmas, as himself; in it, he also shared a scene with Neil Patrick Harris, in a part that was much like his character from How I Met Your Mother.

Burtka starred in Osiris Entertainment's 2013 film Annie and the Gypsy, and had a featured role in the 2014 film Dance Off. 

Burtka returned to Broadway in a comedy play, which David Hyde Pierce directed, titled It Shoulda Been You. In the play, staged in late April 2015, he assumed the role of a Catholic fiancé of a Jewish bride, who was played by Sierra Boggess, whose wedding day is disrupted when her ex-boyfriend shows up at the wedding. Additional cast members included Tyne Daly and Harriet Harris.

Personal life

Six months after Burtka's first How I Met Your Mother appearance, allegations arose that the actor had received the part because of a romantic relationship with one of the show's stars, actor Neil Patrick Harris. Speculation around this story eventually led Harris to acknowledge publicly that he himself was gay in a cover story in People Weekly Magazine. Burtka made no public response to the story, though later Harris stated that he and Burtka were moving in together.

Burtka and Harris attended the Emmy Awards in September 2007 as an openly acknowledged couple for the first time, an appearance that Harris discussed on The Ellen DeGeneres Show.

Burtka's mother died of cancer in May 2008.

On February 4, 2009, Burtka and Harris appeared for the first time on stage together, singing a duet from Rent at a benefit for The LGBT Community Center in New York. The two actors had been together since April 2004. Harris customarily referred to Burtka as "my better half" and "an amazing chef." Burtka and Harris became parents to fraternal twins who were born in October 2010, via a surrogate mother.
Burtka, although not the biological father of his ex Lane Janger's children, who had also been born via surrogate, has remained close to them over the years.

Following the passage of the Marriage Equality Act in New York on June 24, 2011, Burtka and Harris announced their engagement, stating that they had proposed to each other five years earlier but had kept the engagement secret until same-sex marriage became legal in their state.

According to Harris, Burtka quit acting full-time to become a professional chef. He graduated from Le Cordon Bleu College of Culinary Arts Pasadena in the summer of 2009; afterwards, he began running a Los Angeles catering company that he called "Gourmet M.D." Burtka did continue to act, including in It Shoulda Been You on Broadway in 2015.

Burtka's first cookbook, Life is a Party, a collection of recipes and tips on entertaining, was published in April 2019.

Filmography

Film

Television

See also
 LGBT culture in New York City
 List of LGBT people from New York City

References

External links
 
 
 
 David Burtka at the Lortel Archives
 

1975 births
Living people
Male actors from Michigan
American male chefs
American male film actors
American male musical theatre actors
American male dancers
People from Canton, Michigan
American gay actors
University of Michigan alumni
20th-century American male actors
21st-century American male actors
Alumni of Le Cordon Bleu
Gay dancers
LGBT people from Michigan
American people of Polish descent
21st-century LGBT people
LGBT chefs